Paula Poblete Maureira (born 5 August 1978) is a Chilean economist and politician who temporally served as minister of Social Development after Jeannette Vega's departure.

References

External links
 

1978 births
Living people
Pontifical Catholic University of Chile alumni
University of Chile alumni
Democratic Revolution politicians
21st-century Chilean politicians
Government ministers of Chile